Gothic Revival architecture was developed in Poland mainly after the country was partitioned between Prussia, Austria and Russia. It was popular especially in the Prussian partition of Poland. Gothic Revival architecture In Poland often has certain features, derived from the characteristic Polish Brick Gothic architecture style. Churches, schools, post offices, government buildings and palaces were often built in this style. Notable authors of the Polish Gothic Revival style are Jan Sas Zubrzycki, Feliks Księżarski, Józef Pius Dziekoński, Enrico Marconi.

Gallery

See also
Polish Gothic architecture